Muni is the wife of Kashyapa, one of the 60 daughters of Daksha and his wife Asikni. She is called the mother of Apsaras, who "dances in the court" of Devraj, Indra. 

The Bhagavata Purana states that the Apsaras were born from Kashyapa and Muni.

Daughters of Daksha